White Township is the name of some places in the U.S. state of Pennsylvania:
White Township, Beaver County, Pennsylvania
White Township, Cambria County, Pennsylvania
White Township, Indiana County, Pennsylvania

See also:
White Deer Township, Union County, Pennsylvania
Whitehall Township, Lehigh County, Pennsylvania
Whiteley Township, Pennsylvania
Whitemarsh Township, Pennsylvania
Whitpain Township, Pennsylvania

Pennsylvania township disambiguation pages